The 1930–31 Illinois Fighting Illini men's basketball team represented the University of Illinois.

Regular season
The 1930–31 season was head coach Craig Ruby's 9th at the University of Illinois, establishing the first time in the history of Illinois basketball that a head coach remained longer than 8 years.  Ruby had 10 returning lettermen from a team that had finished in a fifth place tie in the Big Ten the year before.  Even though they did not lose any non-conference games, the Fighting Illini showed no improvement in conference play by finishing with a record of 7 wins and 5 losses, however; the team improved to an overall record of 12 wins 5 losses.  The starting lineup included captain Charles Harper, George Fencl and Elbert Kamp at forward, Elbridge May at center with Boyd Owen and Robert Kamp at the guard spots.

Roster

Source

Schedule

|-	
!colspan=12 style="background:#DF4E38; color:white;"| Non-Conference regular season
|- align="center" bgcolor=""

|-	
!colspan=9 style="background:#DF4E38; color:#FFFFFF;"|Big Ten regular season

Bold Italic connotes conference game
												
Source

Awards and honors

References

Illinois Fighting Illini
Illinois Fighting Illini men's basketball seasons
1930 in sports in Illinois
1931 in sports in Illinois